Coral Pink Sand Dunes State Park is a state park in southwestern Utah, United States, located between Mount Carmel Junction and  Kanab, south and west of U.S. Highway 89 in Kane County. The park features uniquely pink-hued sand dunes located beside red sandstone cliffs.

The dunes are formed from the erosion of pink-colored Navajo Sandstone surrounding the park. High winds passing through the notch between the Moquith and Moccasin Mountains pick up loose sand particles and then drop them onto the dunes as a result of the Venturi effect. The dunes are estimated to be between 10,000 and 15,000 years old.

The park allows camping, hiking, off-road vehicle driving, and photography. It was established as a Utah state park in 1963.

Sandboarding is also a popular activity, sandboards and sand sleds can be rented directly at the park.

The Coral Pink Sand Dunes tiger beetle (Cicindela albissima) is endemic to the dunes, being found nowhere else in the world. The park also contains most of the remaining individuals of the rare plant known as Welsh's milkweed (Asclepias welshii), a federally listed threatened species.

References

External links

 
 Official Coral Pink Sand Dunes State Park website
 Sandboarding in Utah

State parks of Utah
Dunes of the United States
Sandstone formations of the United States
Landforms of Kane County, Utah
Protected areas of Kane County, Utah
Protected areas established in 1963
1963 establishments in Utah